Dunn Street is a hamlet near the village of Bredhurst and the M2 motorway, in Maidstone District, in the English county of Kent. It is south of the town of Gillingham.

References 
 Philip's Navigator Britain (page 92)

Borough of Maidstone
Hamlets in Kent